The women's 100 metres hurdles event at the 2000 World Junior Championships in Athletics was held in Santiago, Chile, at Estadio Nacional Julio Martínez Prádanos on 17, 18 and 19 October.

Medalists

Results

Final
19 October
Wind: -1.7 m/s

Semifinals
18 October

Semifinal 1
Wind: -0.9 m/s

Semifinal 2
Wind: -0.4 m/s

Heats
17 October

Heat 1
Wind: -0.2 m/s

Heat 2
Wind: -1.2 m/s

Heat 3
Wind: -0.4 m/s

Heat 4
Wind: +0.1 m/s

Heat 5
Wind: +0.7 m/s

Heat 6
Wind: +0.6 m/s

Participation
According to an unofficial count, 47 athletes from 35 countries participated in the event.

References

100 metres hurdles
Sprint hurdles at the World Athletics U20 Championships